Presidential elections were held in Cape Verde on 18 February 1996. Only one candidate, incumbent António Mascarenhas Monteiro of the Movement for Democracy, contested the election. He was re-elected with around 92.1% of the vote.

Results

References

Cape Verde
Presidential elections in Cape Verde
Presidential
Single-candidate elections
Cape Verde